Lake St. Helen is a  public lake located in Roscommon County in the U.S. state of Michigan, and borders on the community of St. Helen, Michigan.  It is the headwaters for the south branch of the Au Sable River.
From 1998 to 2003, the Lake was subject to a water weed (millfoil) eradication project, involving weevil restocking, which was successful at the time.
Fishing is available throughout the lake, albeit different fish are found in different places, and includes: Largemouth bass, bluegill, crappie, perch, pike, and walleye.  A Bluegill Festival is held each summer.

See also
List of lakes in Michigan

Notes

External links

Annual St. Helen Bluegill Festival

St. Helen
Bodies of water of Roscommon County, Michigan
Tourist attractions in Roscommon County, Michigan